Marion Township is a township in Harrison County, in the U.S. state of Missouri.

Marion Township was erected in ca. 1840s, taking its name from Francis Marion, an officer in the Revolutionary War.

References

Townships in Missouri
Townships in Harrison County, Missouri